The agile frog (Rana dalmatina) is a European frog in the genus Rana of the true frog family, Ranidae.

Description
This species is fat and has long limbs and a pointy snout. Adult males are rarely larger than 6.5 cm, while females can grow up to 8 cm. Its dorsal surface is light brown, reddish-brown, or light greyish-brown with very little contrast. Triangle-shaped spots reach from the temple to the eardrum, which are dark brown. The underside of the agile frog is white without any spots. During mating season, the males often become dark brown.

The hind legs are unusually long, which allow this species to jump further than other similar frogs - they have been known to jump up to two metres in distance. The pupils are horizontal. The colour of the upper third of the iris (above the pupil) is lighter and gold in coloration. The tympanum is about the size of the diameter of the eye. The gland stripes on the frog's back are not very developed and partially interrupted.

Distribution
The agile frog can be found in France, the Channel Islands, parts of Germany, Denmark, Sweden, Italy, the Czech Republic, Slovakia, Austria, Hungary, on the Balkans, Greece, and by the Black Sea. The species once lived in the Great Britain, during middle Saxon times, with archaeological remains recovered in East Anglia. Celtic Reptile & Amphibian have discussed reintroducing the species. It has undergone a reintroduction on Jersey, by Durrel Wildlife Conservation Trust, as it was very close to extirpation on the island.

Reproduction

The call is a fairly quiet "rog ... rog ... rog", and can last for up to 12 seconds, and almost sounds like a clucking chicken. They often also call under water, so the calls can only be heard from a very short distance by observers. Spawning only lasts a few days, and during this period, the males sometimes gather in large calling groups on the water surface to attract females. In Central Europe, spawning usually occurs in the first 20 days of March, but can also be delayed, depending on the weather. Therefore, they rarely sink to the bottom. Unlike the moor frog (Rana arvalis) and common frog (Rana temporaria), the agile frog does not lay its spawn all in one clump.

Habitat
The agile frog prefers light deciduous mixed forests with plentiful water. The open land around a forest is often also populated, as long as it is connected to the forest by shrubs. In dry, warm forests, this species often also lives far away from the water. Of the three Middle European Rana species, this frog likes warmth and dryness the most.

References

External links
 

Rana (genus)
Amphibians of Europe
Amphibians described in 1839